Ulriken Elite is a Norwegian basketball team. It was formed in 1970 by a group of pupils at Ulriken secondary school. Ulriken play their matches in Haukelandshallen in Bergen. The kits are red and white and the coach is Jay Anderson. The team played in the Norwegian top tier BLNO for several years, but withdrew in 2011.

Honours
Norwegian Championship
Winners (4): 1994, 1999, 2000, 2007

External links
Ulriken Elite

Basketball teams in Norway
Sport in Bergen